Pine Grove may refer to the following places in the U.S. state of Louisiana:

Pine Grove, Bienville Parish, Louisiana
Pine Grove, Ouachita Parish, Louisiana
Pine Grove, St. Helena Parish, Louisiana